Imperial Hospital Limited (AKA: Apollo Imperial Hospitals) is a private hospital in Chattogram, Bangladesh. IHL was opened for the public in April 2019 during an inauguration ceremony launched by Devi Shetty, an Indian cardiac surgeon and entrepreneur.

History and background
The construction of Imperial Hospital Limited is  funded by the Chattogram Eye hospital and Training Board Trust, and  invested by the World Bank. In 2015, the hospital authority signed a contract with an Austrian-based healthcare consultancy group Vamed Engineering GmbH & Co KG for construction. IHL's design and drawings prepared by United States-based healthcare architectural and engineering consultant firm Kaplan McLaughlin Diaz (KMD). Around  of land were reserved for the construction the medical complex.

In 2022, after partnership with Chennai based health group Apollo Hospital it renamed as Apollo Imperial Hospitals. Under this agreement it will operate and manage the hospital.

Medical facilities
In other facilities the hospital has 88 single cabins, 76 double cabins, 14 modular operating theatres, 16 nurses stations, 62 consulting rooms with outpatient department facilities, 64 critical care beds, 44 beds for newborn, Neonatal intensive care unit with 44 beds, and eight pediatric intensive care unit (ICU).

gallery

References

External links
 
 IHL Chittagong

Hospitals in Chittagong
2019 establishments in Bangladesh
Hospitals established in 2019
Kaplan McLaughlin Diaz buildings
Private hospitals in Bangladesh
Hospital buildings completed in 2019